The lesser small-toothed rat or western small-toothed rat (Macruromys elegans) is a species of rodent in the family Muridae.
It is found only in West Papua, Indonesia.

References

Macruromys
Mammals of Western New Guinea
Mammals described in 1933
Taxonomy articles created by Polbot
Endemic fauna of New Guinea
Taxa named by Georg Hermann Wilhelm Stein
Rodents of New Guinea